At the 1994 Commonwealth Games, the athletics event were held in Victoria, BC, Canada, at the Centennial Stadium on the grounds of the University of Victoria. A total of 44 events were contested, of which 22 by male 19 by female athletes. Furthermore, 2 men's disability events were held within the programme.

There were 126 medals decided in total with England topping the table with 36 medals in total. Australia were second with 22 and the host nation Canada came third with 15.

The competition saw both the rise and fall of Horace Dove-Edwin, a sprinter from Sierra Leone. He became his country's first Commonwealth medallist with an unexpected silver medal behind Linford Christie in the 100 metres. He had not attended the opening ceremony as his country did not have enough money for a uniform and his story attracted much public sympathy and attention from the press. His meteoric rise (improving from 10.34 seconds to 10.02 over two days) was swiftly punctured as he was banned for two years after his doping test came back positive for the steroid stanozolol.

Medal summary

Men

Men's EAD

Women

Medal table

Participation

See also
Athletics at the 1992 Summer Olympics
1994 in athletics (track and field)
1995 World Championships in Athletics

References
General
 
Commonwealth Games Medallists - Men. GBR Athletics. Retrieved on 2010-07-21.
Commonwealth Games Medallists - Women. GBR Athletics. Retrieved on 2010-07-21.
Specific

 
1994
Commonwealth Games
1994 Commonwealth Games events
1994 Commonwealth Games